Polyrhaphis is a genus of longhorn beetles of the subfamily Lamiinae, containing the following species:

 Polyrhaphis angustata Buquet, 1853
 Polyrhaphis argentina Lane, 1978
 Polyrhaphis armiger (Schoenherr, 1817)
 Polyrhaphis baloupae Santos-Silva, Martins & Tavakilian, 2010
 Polyrhaphis batesi Hovore & McCarty, 1998
 Polyrhaphis belti Hovore & McCarty, 1998
 Polyrhaphis confusa Lane, 1978
 Polyrhaphis fabricii Thomson, 1865
 Polyrhaphis gracilis Bates, 1862
 Polyrhaphis grandini Buquet, 1853
 Polyrhaphis hystricina Bates, 1862
 Polyrhaphis jansoni Pascoe, 1859
 Polyrhaphis kempfi Lane, 1978
 Polyrhaphis lanei Santos-Silva, Martins & Tavakilian, 2010
 Polyrhaphis michaeli McCarty, 1997
 Polyrhaphis olivieri Thomson, 1865
 Polyrhaphis papulosa (Olivier, 1795)
 Polyrhaphis peruana Santos-Silva, Martins & Tavakilian, 2010
 Polyrhaphis pilosa Lane, 1965
 Polyrhaphis spinipennis Laporte, 1840
 Polyrhaphis spinosa (Drury, 1773)
 Polyrhaphis turnbowi Hovore & McCarty, 1998

References

Polyrhaphidini